Majidabad (also Romanized as Majīdābād) is a village in Gavdul-e Gharbi Rural District, in the Central District of Malekan County, East Azerbaijan Province, Iran. At the 2006 census, its population was 543, in 136 families.

References 

Populated places in Malekan County